James Henry Brady (June 12, 1862 – January 13, 1918) was a Republican politician from the U.S. state of Idaho. He served as the state's eighth governor from 1909 to 1911 and a United States Senator for nearly five years, from 1913 until his death.

Early years
Born in Indiana County, Pennsylvania, at age three, Brady moved with his parents to Johnson County, Kansas. He was educated in public schools, and graduated from Leavenworth Normal College in Kansas.

Brady taught school, worked in the real estate business, and as editor of a newspaper. He moved to Idaho in 1895 at age thirty-three, and became successful in the water power and irrigation industries.

Political career
Brady was a delegate to the Republican National Convention in 1900, and chairman of the Idaho Republican Party in 1904 and 1908. He was named a delegate to the Republican National Committee again in 1908 and 1916.

Elected governor in 1908, Brady lost his bid for re-election in 1910, and returned to the private sector until he was elected to the U.S. Senate in January 1913, chosen by the Idaho Legislature to replace Kirtland Perky, who was appointed after Weldon Heyburn's death in October 1912. In 1914, Brady became the first elected to the Senate from Idaho by direct popular vote, defeating former Democratic Governor James H. Hawley and a handful of minor party candidates. Idaho's senior senator, William Borah, went before the voters for the first time four years later in 1918, and was easily re-elected to a third term.

While in office, Brady suffered a heart attack, and died two weeks later in Washington, D.C., on January 13, 1918. He was cremated and his ashes deposited in the James H. Brady Memorial Chapel of Mountain View Cemetery in Pocatello.

Legacy
Brady's great-grandson, Jerry Brady, was the 2002 and 2006 Democratic gubernatorial candidate in Idaho.

See also

 National Irrigation Congress
 List of United States Congress members who died in office (1900–49)

References

External links

 James H. Brady, late a senator from Idaho, Memorial addresses delivered in the House of Representatives and Senate frontispiece 1920

1862 births
1918 deaths
People from Indiana County, Pennsylvania
Republican Party governors of Idaho
American Congregationalists
Republican Party United States senators from Idaho
19th-century American politicians
20th-century American politicians